Daniel J. Murphy is an Australian botanist.

Biography 
Daniel J. Murphy completed his Ph.D. at the School of Botany, The University of Melbourne in 2001.
Murphy is currently a Senior Research Scientist based at the National Herbarium of Victoria. Murphy's research is molecular based, investigating systematics, taxonomy, classification and biogeography of flowering plants. Murphy's taxa of interest include Acacia, Persoonia, Adansonia, Vachellia farnesiana and grasses.

Murphy is currently an Associate Editor with the following journals:
Muelleria (journal)
Australian Systematic Botany

The National Herbarium of Victoria holds over 200 specimens collected by Murphy and many more as an additional collector. Other herbaria in Australia holding his collections include the University of Melbourne Herbarium, Australian National Herbarium, Western Australian Herbarium, National Herbarium of New South Wales, Tasmanian Herbarium, and the N.C.W. Beadle Herbarium.

Standard author abbreviation

Selected published names
Acacia leprosa var. crassipoda Maslin & D.J.Murphy
Acacia leprosa var. graveolens Maslin & D.J.Murphy 
Acacia leprosa var. magna Maslin & D.J.Murphy 
Acacia leprosa var. uninervia Maslin & D.J.Murphy 
Acacia rostriformis Maslin & D.J.Murphy 
Acacia stictophylla Court ex Maslin & D.J.Murphy 
Falcataria pullenii (Verdc.) Gill.K.Br., D.J.Murphy & Ladiges 
Falcataria toona (F.M.Bailey) Gill.K.Br., D.J.Murphy & Ladiges 
 See also :Category:Taxa named by Daniel J. Murphy

and

International Plant Name Index

Selected publications

Books

Chapters
Luckow, M., Miller, J.T., Murphy, D.J. and Livshultz, T. (2003). A phylogenetic analysis of the Mimosoideae (Leguminosae) based on chloroplast DNA sequence data. In B. Klitgaard and A. Bruneau (eds), Advances in Legume Systematics,part 10, pp. 197–220. Royal Botanic Gardens, Kew.

Journal articles
Murphy, D.J., Udovicic, F. and Ladiges, P.Y. (2000). Phylogenetic analysis of Australian Acacia (Leguminosae: Mimosoideae) using sequence variations of an intron and two intergenic spacers of chloroplast DNA. Australian Systematic Botany 13, 745–754

References 

Botanists active in Australia
20th-century Australian botanists
21st-century Australian botanists
University of Melbourne alumni
Living people
Year of birth missing (living people)
Muelleria (journal) editors